Micraspis flavovittata is a species of ladybird of the genus Micraspis. The species was described by Crotch in 1874. The species was presumed to become extinct until an amateur naturalist found about 40 individuals of the species in the Discovery Bay Coastal Park in western Victoria.

References

Coccinellidae
Beetles described in 1874
Insects of Australia